Altitude Air Pvt. Ltd is a helicopter airline based at Tribhuvan International Airport in Kathmandu, Nepal, operating chartered helicopter services. The company was established in 2016 and mainly carries out rescue and charter flights.

History 
Altitude Air was founded in 2016 in Kathmandu, Nepal, by various Nepalese tourism entrepreneurs. It carries out domestic chartered helicopter flights throughout Nepal from its hub in Kathmandu. It is planning to be the first airline to introduce the AgustaWestland AW119 Koala to the Nepalese market and has already carried out demonstration flights.

Fleet
The Altitude Air fleet consists of the following aircraft (as of April 2019):

Accidents and incidents 
 8 September 2018 – A Eurocopter AS 350 helicopter of Altitude Air crashed in Nuwakot District en route from Gorkha District to Kathmandu. Out of the seven people on board, only one survived.

References

External links
 

Airlines of Nepal
Helicopter airlines
Airlines established in 2016
2016 establishments in Nepal